Jorge Borell (born 20 September 1943) is a Spanish water polo player. He competed in the men's tournament at the 1968 Summer Olympics.

References

1943 births
Living people
Spanish male water polo players
Olympic water polo players of Spain
Water polo players at the 1968 Summer Olympics
Water polo players from Barcelona
20th-century Spanish people